The 1881–82 Football Association of Wales Challenge Cup was the fifth season of the competition.

First round

Group One

Source: Welsh Football Data Archive

Aberystwyth receive a bye to the next round.

Group Two

Source: Welsh Football Data Archive

Group Three

Source: Welsh Football Data Archive

Second round

Group A

Source: Welsh Football Data Archive

Gwersyllt Foresters receive a bye to the next round.

Group B

Source: Welsh Football Data Archive

Group C

Source: Welsh Football Data Archive

Replay

Source: Welsh Football Data Archive

Third round

Source: Welsh Football Data Archive

Replay

Source: Welsh Football Data Archive

Semi-final

Source: Welsh Football Data Archive

Druids receive a bye ito the final.

Replay

Source: Welsh Football Data Archive

Final

References

 The History of the Welsh Cup 1877-1993 by Ian Garland (1991) 
 Welsh Football Data Archive

1881-82
1881–82 in Welsh football
1881–82 domestic association football cups